is a Japanese voice actor. His first starring role was as Kouji Kabuto in Shin Mazinger Shougeki! Z Hen and he also went on to portray the Producer in the anime adaptation of The Idolmaster video game series. In 2014, he provided the voice of Dragon Shiryū in the film Saint Seiya: Legend of Sanctuary, a role he said was "cool" and "serious".

Roles

Anime television series
2009
Eden of the East (AKX20000)
Shin Mazinger Shougeki! Z Hen (Koji Kabuto)
Taishō Baseball Girls (Izawa)
2011
Bakugan: Gundalian Invaders (Koji Beetle)
The Idolmaster (Producer)
2012
Brave 10 (Niko)
Magi: The Labyrinth of Magic (M Nando)
Senki Zesshō Symphogear (Sakuya Fujitaka)
Sword Art Online (Tetsuo)
2013
Cardfight!! Vanguard (Kenji Mitsusada)
Meganebu! (Akira Souma)
Senki Zesshō Symphogear G (Sakuya Fujitaka)
Space Battleship Yamato 2199 (Yasuo Nanbu)
2014
Atelier Escha & Logy: Alchemists of the Dusk Sky (Awin Sidelet)
Terra Formars (Ivan Perepelkin)
2015
Anti-Magic Academy: The 35th Test Platoon (Kyouya Kirigaya)
Chaos Dragon (Fugaku)
Punchline (Ryuuto Teraoka)
Senki Zesshō Symphogear GX (Sakuya Fujitaka)
Triage X (Arashi Mikami)
2016
Hybrid x Heart Magias Academy Ataraxia (Kizuna Hida)
Three Leaves, Three Colors (Mitsugu Yamaji)
Bloodivores (Mi Liu)
2017
 Kado: The Right Answer (Shūhei Asano)
 Senki Zesshō Symphogear AXZ (Sakuya Fujitaka)
 My First Girlfriend Is a Gal (Keigo Ishida)
 Chronos Ruler (Blaze)
 Ikemen Sengoku: Toki o Kakeru ga Koi wa Hajimaranai (Sarutobi Sasuke)
 King's Game The Animation (Hideki Toyoda)
2019
 Senki Zesshō Symphogear XV (Sakuya Fujitaka)
2020
 Sakura Wars: The Animation (Valery Kaminski) 
 Uzaki-chan Wants to Hang Out! (Shinichi Sakurai)
 Yatogame-chan Kansatsu Nikki 2 Satsume (Teppei)
 Boruto: Naruto Next Generations (Yoruga)
2021
 World Trigger Season 2 (Rokurō Wakamura)
 Yatogame-chan Kansatsu Nikki 3 Satsume (Teppei)
 The World's Finest Assassin Gets Reincarnated in Another World as an Aristocrat (Lugh)
 Komi Can't Communicate (Shigeo Chiarai)
2022
 Don't Hurt Me, My Healer! (Orc)
 Uzaki-chan Wants to Hang Out! ω (Shinichi Sakurai)
2023
 Isekai Shōkan wa Nidome Desu (Brad)
 The Idolmaster Million Live! (Chief Producer)

Film
Saint Seiya: Legend of Sanctuary (2014) (Dragon Shiryū)
Cencoroll Connect (2019) (Gotōda)
Toku Touken Ranbu: Hanamaru ~Setsugetsuka~ (2022) (Minamoto Kiyomaro)

OVA
Valkyria Chronicles III (2011)

Video games
Unchained Blades (2011) (Níðhöggr)
Atelier Escha & Logy: Alchemists of the Dusk Sky (2013) (Awin Sidelet)
JoJo's Bizarre Adventure: All Star Battle (2013) (Guido Mista)
JoJo's Bizarre Adventure: Eyes of Heaven (2015) (Guido Mista)
Yume Oukoku to Nemureru no 100 nin no ouji-sama (2015) (Lid)Fate/Grand Order (2015) (Kadoc Zemlupus, Watanabe no Tsuna)
Ikémen Sengoku (2017) (Sarutobi Sasuke)
Dragon Ball Legends (2018) (Shallot)
Caligula Overdose (2018) (Biwasaka Eiji)
Café Enchanté (2019) (Misyr Rex)
World's End Club (2020) (Aniki)
Live A Live (2022) (Akira)

Tokusatsu
2009
Kamen Rider × Kamen Rider W & Decade: Movie War 2010 (Skyrider, Kamen Rider Faiz)
2018
Uchu Sentai Kyuranger vs. Space Squad (Touma Amaki/Jiraiya)
Mashin Sentai Kiramager ( Mashin Mach voice) 2020 - 2021

Dubbing
2:37 (Theo (Xavier Samuel))
Easy A ("Woodchuck" Todd (Penn Badgley))

References

External links
 

Japanese male video game actors
Japanese male voice actors
1984 births
Living people
Male voice actors from Chiba Prefecture
Aoni Production voice actors
21st-century Japanese male actors